Talvat (also Romanized as Ţalvat, Talūt, and Tolūt) is a village in Babol Kenar Rural District, Babol Kenar District, Babol County, Mazandaran Province, Iran. At the 2006 census, its population was 1,040, in 266 families.

References 

Populated places in Babol County